Heather (Calluna vulgaris) is used as a food plant by the larvae of a number of Lepidoptera species, including:

 Coleophoridae
 Several Coleophora case-bearer species:
 C. juncicolella
 C. pyrrhulipennella
 Geometridae
Double-striped pug (Gymnoscelis rufifasciata)
Engrailed (Ectropis crepuscularia)
Lime-speck pug (Eupithecia centaureata)
Mottled beauty (Alcis repandata)
Scalloped oak (Crocallis elinguaria)
Winter moth (Operophtera brumata)
Wormwood pug (Eupithecia absinthiata)
Lycaenidae
Silver-studded blue (Plebejus argus)
 Noctuidae
Autumnal rustic (Eugnorisma glareosa)
Dot moth (Melanchra persicariae)
Ingrailed clay (Diarsia mendica)
Lesser yellow underwing (Noctua comes)
Northern deep-brown dart (Aporophyla lueneburgensis)
True lover's knot (Lycophotia porphyria)
 Saturniidae
Emperor moth (Pavonia pavonia)

External links

Calluna